The Universidad del Aconcagua, generally known as UDA, is a non-profit private university founded in 1965. It is located in the city of Mendoza, Argentina.

Academic units
School of Social Sciences 
Business Administration
International Commerce
Commercialization
Graphic Design
Publicity 
Computing
Software
Telecommunications
Institutional Relations
Health Administration
School of Medicine
Medicine
Obstetrics
Speech-language pathology
Physical Education
School of Economics and Law
Accounting
Economics
Law
Notary
School of Psychology
Psychology
Psychopedagogy
Criminology
Citizen Security
School of Languages
English
English Translation

External links
Official website  

Educational institutions established in 1965
Universities in Mendoza Province
Buildings and structures in Mendoza, Argentina
1965 establishments in Argentina